Héctor Benjamín Alterio Onorato (born 21 September 1929) is an Argentine theatre, film and television actor, well known both in Argentina and Spain.

Biography 
Alterio's theatre debut came in 1948 as the lead in Cómo suicidarse en primavera ("How to commit suicide in spring"). After finishing drama school, he created the Nuevo Teatro ("New Theatre") company in 1950, where he worked until 1968 and helped change the Argentine theatrical scene of the 1960s.

He also worked in the Argentine cinema. His debut on the silver screen took place in Alfredo Mathé's Todo sol es amargo (Every sun is bitter) in 1965. He then participated in many of the most important Argentine movies of the 1970s, including La Patagonia rebelde (The Rebel Patagonia), which was awarded a Silver Bear at the 24th Berlin International Film Festival. His voice was used in Ya es tiempo de violencia (1969), an anonymous film about the Cordobazo riots which took place the same year. The film was produced by Enrique Juárez, close to the Grupo Cine Liberación.

While in Spain in 1975, he received death threats from the Argentine Anticommunist Alliance.  He decided not to return to Argentina and remained in exile.

Consequently, Alterio began to work in Spanish films, including A un dios desconocido (1977) and received the Best Actor award at the Donostia-San Sebastián International Film Festival, and El nido (1980), and for his effort received the Best Actor award from the Association of Latin Entertainment Critics in 1983.

After the restoration of democracy in Argentina in 1982, Alterio worked in films produced in both countries and some co-productions.

In 2004 he received an Honorary Goya Award for his lifetime body of works.

Religiously Alterio is an atheist.

Roles in Academy Award-nominated films
Héctor Alterio has been in five Oscar-nominated as Best Foreign Language Film pictures:
The Truce – (1974)
The Nest – (1980)
Camila – (1984)
The Official Story – (1985)
Son of the Bride – (2001)

The fourth of them won the award in the 58th Academy Awards, and was also nominated as Best Original Screenplay.  All of these films, except for The Nest, which was submitted by Spain, has been submitted to the awards by Argentina.

Selected filmography

 Todo sol es amargo (1966)
 Cómo seducir a una mujer (1967)
 Don Segundo Sombra (1969) - Gaucho in Black
 El santo de la espada (1970) - Gen. Simón Bolívar
 La fidelidad (1970)
 El habilitado (1971)
 Argentino hasta la muerte (1971)
 Y que patatín, y que patatán (1971)
 La mafia (1972) - Paolatti
 Paño verde (1973)
 Los siete locos (1973) - Gregorio Barsut
 La Piel del amor (1973) - Luis
 Las Venganzas de Beto Sánchez (1973) - Coronel Sagasti
 Los golpes bajos (1974)
 Quebracho (1974)
 La Patagonia rebelde (1974) - Cmdr. Zavala
 La tregua (1974) - Martín Santomé
 El Amor infiel (1974) - Morales
 Cría Cuervos (1976) - Anselmo
 Pascual Duarte (1976) - Esteban Duarte Diniz
 La menor (1976)
 Fango (1977) - Carlos
 Asignatura pendiente (1977) - Rafa
 Secretos de alcoba (1977) - Carlos
 A un dios desconocido (1977) - José
 La guerra de papá (1977) - Papá (Pablo)
 Marian (1977) - Alfredo
 El mirón (1977) - Roman - husband
 Las truchas (1978) - Gonzalo
 Las palabras de Max (1978) - Julián
 Arriba Hazaña (1978) - Hermano Director
 Borrasca (1978) - Alberto Pineda
 La escopeta nacional (1978)
 ¿Qué hace una chica como tú en un sitio como éste? (1978)
 Serenata a la luz de la Luna (1978)
 Tres en raya (1979) - Padre de Carlos
 Tiempos de constitución (1979)
 F.E.N. (1980) - Alfredo
 Memorias de Leticia Valle (1980) - Alberto
 El crimen de Cuenca (1980) - Isasa
 El Nido (1980) - Don Alejandro
 En mil pedazos (1980) - Armando Novaes
 Tiro al aire (1980)
 Otra vez adiós (1980)
 Los viernes de la eternidad (1981) - Don Gervasio Urquiaga
 Kargus (1981)
 Tac-Tac (1981) - Leonardo Gala
 Volver (1982)
 Asesinato en el Comité Central (1982) - Sepúlveda
 Corazón de papel (1982) - D. Arcadio Nieto
 La vida, el amor y la muerte (1982) - Regino
 Antonieta (1982) - Leon
 Il quartetto Basileus (1983) - Alvaro
 La mujer del juez (1984) - Marcial / Paz's lover
 El señor Galíndez (1984) - Beto
 Camila (1984) - Adolfo O'Gorman
 De grens (1984) - Andras Menzo
 Los chicos de la guerra (1984) - Padre de Pablo
 La rosales (1984)
 Zama (1984)
 Contar hasta diez (1985)
 La historia oficial (1985) - Roberto
 Adiós, Roberto (1985)
 Flesh + Blood (1985) - Niccolo
 A la pálida luz de la Luna (1985) - Miguel Gil de Larios
 Manuel y Clemente (1986) - Serafin
 Puzzle (1986) - Luis
 Contar hasta diez (1986)
 El hombre de la deuda externa (1987) - Pedro
 Sofía (1987) - Padre de Pedro
 Mi General (1987) - General Víctor Mendizábal
 La veritat oculta (1987) - Alfons Garriga
 Barbablu Barbablu (1987) - Federico
 El verano del potro (1989) - Federico
 Continental (1990) - Ruda
 Yo, la peor de todas (1990) - The Viceroy
 Gentile Alouette (1990)
 Don Juan in Hell (1991) - Padre de Don Juan
 Tango (1993) - Feroz Lobo
 as boludas (1993)
 El detective y la muerte (1994) - G.M.
 King of the River (1995) - Juan
 Caballos salvajes (1995) - José
 Tatiana, la muñeca rusa (1995) - Diego
 Cenizas del paraíso (1997) - Judge Costa Makantasis
 Pequeños milagros (1997) - Padre de Rosalía
 Memorias del ángel caído (1997) - Julio
 Asesinato a distancia (1998) - Bilverio Punes
 Diario para un cuento (1998) - Pablo
 Las huellas borradas (1999) - Don José
 Un dulce olor a muerte (1999) - Justino
 Héroes y demonios (1999) - Jorge Romans
 La mujer más fea del mundo (1999) - Dr. Werner
 Suenas en la mitad del mundo – Cuentos ecuatorianos (1999)
 Los libros y la noche (1999, Documentary)
 I Know Who You Are (2000) - Salgado
 Plata quemada (2000) - Losardo
 Esperando al Mesías (2000) - Simón
 Cabeza de tigre (2001) - Santiago de Liniers
 Sagitario (2001) - Gustavo
 El hijo de la novia (2001) - Nino Belvedere
 Vidas privadas (2001) - Padre de Carmen / Carmen's Father
 Nobel (2001) - Alberto
 Noche de reyes (2001) - Sr. Garriga
 Fumata blanca (2002) - Cardinal Giovanello
 El Último tren (2002) - El Profesor
 Apasionados (2002) - Coco
 Kamchatka (2002) - Grandfather
 Nudos (2003) - Cipriano Mera
 Utopía (2003) - Samuel
 Cleopatra (2003) - Roberto
 Le intermittenze del cuore (2003) - Saul Mortara
 Noviembre (2003) - Yuta
 En ninguna parte (2004) - Antonio
 Semen, una historia de amor (2005) - Emilio
 A Tram in SP (2008) - Lucas
 Awaking from a Dream (2008) - Pascual
 Intruders (2011) - Old Priest
 Como estrellas fugaces (2012) - Generale
 Kamikaze (2014) - Lionel
 Fermín glorias del tango (2014) - Fermin

Awards
Won:
 Argentine Film Critics Association Awards: Silver Condor for Best Supporting Actor for La maffia, 1973.
 Donostia-San Sebastián International Film Festival: Prize San Sebastián, Best Actor, for A un dios desconocido, 1977.
 Association of Latin Entertainment Critics: Best Actor, for El nido, 1980.
 Valladolid International Film Festival: Best Actor, for El Último tren, 2002.
 Cinema Writers Circle Awards: CEC Award Best Supporting Actor, for El Hijo de la novia, 2002, Spain.
 Goya Awards: Lifetime Achievement Honorary Award, 2004.

Nominated
 Argentine Film Critics Association Awards: Nominated for four Silver Condors (1998, 2001, 2002, and 2003).

References

External links 

 
 

1929 births
Argentine male film actors
Argentine male stage actors
Argentine male television actors
Living people
Argentine expatriates in Spain
Honorary Goya Award winners
Argentine people of Italian descent
Male actors from Buenos Aires
Argentine atheists